The Balkan sprachbund or Balkan language area is an ensemble of areal features—similarities in grammar, syntax, vocabulary and phonology—among the languages of the Balkans. Several features are found across these languages though not all apply to every single language. The Balkan sprachbund is a prominent example of the sprachbund concept.

The languages of the Balkan sprachbund share their similarities despite belonging to various separate language family (genetic) branches. The Slavic, Hellenic, Romance, Albanian and Indo-Aryan branches all belong to the large Indo-European family, and the Turkish language is non-Indo-European.

Some of the languages use these features for their standard language (i.e. those whose homeland lies almost entirely within the region) whilst other populations to whom the land is not a cultural pivot (as they have wider communities outside of it) may still adopt the features for their local register.

While some of these languages may share little vocabulary, their grammars have very extensive similarities; for example:

 They have similar case systems, in those that have preserved grammatical case  and verb conjugation systems.
 They have all become more analytic, although to differing degrees. 
 Some of those languages mark evidentiality, which is uncommon among Indo-European languages, and was likely inspired by contact with Turkish.

The reason for these similarities is not a settled question among experts. Genetic commonalities, language contact, and the geopolitical history of the region all seem to be relevant factors, but many disagree over the specifics and degree of these factors.

History
The earliest scholar to notice the similarities between Balkan languages belonging to different families was the Slovenian scholar Jernej Kopitar in 1829. August Schleicher (1850) more explicitly developed the concept of areal relationships as opposed to genetic ones, and Franz Miklosich (1861) studied the relationships of Balkan Slavic and Romance more extensively.

Nikolai Trubetzkoy (1923), Kristian Sandfeld-Jensen (1926), and Gustav Weigand (1925, 1928) developed the theory in the 1920s and 1930s.

In the 1930s, the Romanian linguist Alexandru Graur criticized the notion of “Balkan linguistics,” saying that one can talk about “relationships of borrowings, of influences, but not about Balkan linguistics”.

The term "Balkan language area" was coined by the Romanian linguist Alexandru Rosetti in 1958, when he claimed that the shared features conferred the Balkan languages a special similarity. Theodor Capidan went further, claiming that the structure of Balkan languages could be reduced to a standard language. Many of the earliest reports on this theory were in German, hence the term "Balkansprachbund" is often used as well.

Languages

The languages that share these similarities belong to five distinct branches of the Indo-European languages:
 Albanian
 Hellenic (Greek)
 Eastern Romance (Romanian, Aromanian, Megleno-Romanian, and Istro-Romanian)
 South Slavic (Bosnian, Bulgarian, Croatian, Gorani, Macedonian, Montenegrin, Serbian, Slovenian, and Torlakian).
 Indo-Aryan (Romani)

The Finnish linguist Jouko Lindstedt computed in 2000 a "Balkanization factor" which gives each Balkan language a score proportional with the number of features shared in the Balkan language area. The results were:

Another language that may have been influenced by the Balkan language union is the Judaeo-Spanish variant that used to be spoken by Sephardi Jews living in the Balkans. The grammatical features shared (especially regarding the tense system) were most likely borrowed from Greek.

Origins
The source of these features as well as the directions have long been debated, and various theories were suggested.

Thracian, Illyrian or Dacian and Albanian as successive language
Early researchers, including Kopitar, believed they must have been inherited from the Paleo-Balkan languages (e.g. Illyrian, Thracian and Dacian) which formed the substrate for modern Balkan languages.  But since very little is known about Paleo-Balkan languages, it cannot be determined whether the features were present. The strongest candidate for a shared Paleo-Balkan feature is the postposed article.

Greek
Another theory, advanced by Kristian Sandfeld in 1930, was that these features were an entirely Greek influence, under the presumption that since Greece "always had a superior civilization compared to its neighbours", Greek could not have borrowed its linguistic features from them. However, no ancient dialects of Greek possessed Balkanisms, so that the features shared with other regional languages appear to be post-classical innovations. Also, Greek appears to be only peripheral to the Balkan language area, lacking some important features, such as the postposed article. Nevertheless, several of the features that Greek does share with the other languages (loss of dative, replacement of infinitive by subjunctive constructions, object clitics, formation of future with auxiliary verb "to want") probably originated in Medieval Greek and spread to the other languages through Byzantine influence.

Latin and Romance
The Roman Empire ruled all the Balkans, and local variation of Latin may have left its mark on all languages there, which were later the substrate to Slavic newcomers. This was proposed by Georg Solta. The weak point of this theory is that other Romance languages have few of the features, and there is no proof that the Balkan Romans were isolated for enough time to develop them. An argument for this would be the structural borrowings or "linguistic calques" into Macedonian from Aromanian, which could be explained by Aromanian being a substrate of Macedonian, but this still does not explain the origin of these innovations in Aromanian. The analytic perfect with the auxiliary verb "to have" (which some Balkan languages share with Western European languages), is the only feature whose origin can fairly safely be traced to Latin.

Multiple sources

The most commonly accepted theory, advanced by Polish scholar Zbigniew Gołąb, is that the innovations came from different sources and the languages influenced each other: some features can be traced from Latin, Slavic, or Greek languages, whereas others, particularly features that are shared only by Romanian, Albanian, Macedonian and Bulgarian, could be explained by the substratum kept after Romanization (in the case of Romanian) or Slavicization (in the case of Bulgarian). Albanian was influenced by both Latin and Slavic, but it kept many of its original characteristics.

Several arguments favour this theory. First, throughout the turbulent history of the Balkans, many groups of people moved to another place, inhabited by people of another ethnicity. These small groups were usually assimilated quickly and sometimes left marks in the new language they acquired. Second, the use of more than one language was common in the Balkans before the modern age, and a drift in one language would quickly spread to other languages.  Third, the dialects that have the most "balkanisms" are those in regions where people had contact with people of many other languages.

Features

Grammatical features

Case system
The number of cases is reduced, several cases being replaced with prepositions, the only exception being Serbo-Croatian. In Bulgarian and Macedonian, on the other hand, this development has actually led to the loss of all cases except the vocative.

A common case system of a Balkan language is:

 Nominative
 Accusative
 Dative / Genitive (merged)
 Vocative

Syncretism of genitive and dative
In the Balkan languages, the genitive and dative cases (or corresponding prepositional constructions) undergo syncretism.

Example:
{| class="wikitable"
! Language
! Dative
! Genitive
|-
| English
| I gave the book to Maria. 
| It is Maria's book.
|-
| Albanian
| 
| 
|-
| Aromanian
|  
| 
|-
| Bulgarian
| []
| []
|-
| Romanian
| colloq. for fem. (oblig. for masc.):
(oblig. for masc.):|-
| Macedonian
| []
| []
|-
| rowspan="2" |
Greek
| []     or[]
| []
|-
| []'I gave it to her.'
| []'It is her book.'

|}

Syncretism of locative and directional expressions

Note: In Romanian this is an exception, and it only applies when referring to individual countries, e.g. The rule is that into translates as ”” when trying to express destination, e.g.

Verb tenses

 Future tense 
The future tense is formed in an analytic way using an auxiliary verb or particle with the meaning "will, want", referred to as de-volitive, similar to the way the future is formed in English.  This feature is present to varying degrees in each language.  Decategorization is less advanced in fossilized literary Romanian  and in Serbo-Croatian , where the future marker is still an inflected auxiliary. In modern Greek, Bulgarian, Macedonian, and Albanian, Aromanian, and spoken Romanian, decategorization and erosion have given rise to an uninflected tense form, where the frozen third-person singular of the verb has turned into an invariable particle followed by the main verb inflected for person (compare Rom 1.sg. , 2.sg. , 3.sg.  > invariable  > mod. ). Certain Torlakian dialects also have an invariant future tense marker in the form of the proclitic third-person-singular present form of the verb 'to want':  'I will see',  "you will see",  'he/she/it will see'.

Analytic perfect tense
The analytic perfect tense is formed in the Balkan languages with the verb "to have" and, usually, a past passive participle, similarly to the construction found in Germanic and other Romance languages: e.g. Romanian  "I have promised", Albanian  "I have promised". A somewhat less typical case of this is Greek, where the verb "to have" is followed by the so-called  ('invariant form', historically the aorist infinitive): . However, a completely different construction is used in Bulgarian and Serbo-Croatian, which have inherited from Common Slavic an analytic perfect formed with the verb "to be" and the past active participle: ,  (Bul.) / ,  (Ser.) - "I have promised" (lit. "I am having-promised"). On the other hand, Macedonian, the third Slavic language in the sprachbund, is like Romanian and Albanian in that it uses quite typical Balkan constructions consisting of the verb to have and a past passive participle (= "I have promised"). Macedonian also has a perfect formed with the verb "to be", like Bulgarian and Serbo-Croatian.

Renarrative mood
The so-called renarrative mood is another shared feature of the Balkan languages, including Turkish. It is used for statements that are not based on direct observation or common knowledge, but repeat what was reported by others. For example, Патот бил затворен in Macedonian means "The road was closed (or so I heard)". Speakers who use the indicative mood instead and state "Патот беше затворен" imply thereby that they personally witnessed the road's closure.

Avoidance or loss of infinitive
The use of the infinitive (common in other languages related to some of the Balkan languages, such as Romance and Slavic) is generally replaced with subjunctive constructions, following early Greek innovation.

 in Bulgarian, Macedonian and Tosk Albanian, the loss of the infinitive is complete
 in demotic (vernacular) Greek, the loss of the infinitive was complete, whereas in literary Greek (Katharevousa, abolished in 1976) it was not; the natural fusion of the vernacular with Katharevousa resulted in the creation of the contemporary common Greek (Modern Standard Greek), where the infinitive, when used, is principally used as noun (e.g.  "speaking, fluency, eloquence",  "writing",  "being", etc.) deriving directly from the ancient Greek infinitive formation. But its substitution by the subjunctive form when the infinitive would be used as a verb is complete. Most of the times, the subjunctive form substitutes the infinitive also in the cases when it would be used as a noun (e.g.  /  "to go, the act of going",  /  "to see/be seeing, the act of seeing" instead of the infinitive "", etc.)
 in Aromanian and Southern Serbo-Croatian dialects, it is almost complete
 in Gheg Albanian, the infinitive, constructed by the particle "me" plus the past participle, is in full use
 in standard Romanian (prepositional phrase:  + verb stem) and Serbo-Croatian, the infinitive shares many of its functions with the subjunctive. In these two languages, the infinitive will always be found in dictionaries and language textbooks. However, in Romanian, the inherited infinitive form (and ) is now used only as a verbal noun.
 Turkish as spoken in Sliven and Šumen has also almost completely lost the infinitive, but not verbal nouns using the same grammatical form. This is clearly due to the influence of the Balkan sprachbund.

For example, "I want to write" in several Balkan languages:

But here is an example of a relict form, preserved in Bulgarian:

Bare subjunctive constructions
Sentences that include only a subjunctive construction can be used to express a wish, a mild command, an intention, or a suggestion.

This example translates in the Balkan languages the phrase "You should go!", using the subjunctive constructions.

Morphology

Postposed article
With the exception of Greek, Serbo-Croatian, and Romani, all languages in the union have their definite article attached to the end of the noun, instead of before it. None of the related languages (like other Romance languages or Slavic languages) share this feature, with the notable exception of the northern Russian dialects, and it is thought to be an innovation created and spread in the Balkans. It is possible that postposed article in Balkan Slavic is the result of influence from Balkan Romance languages (Romanian or Aromanian) during the Middle ages. However, each language created its own internal articles, so the Romanian articles are related to the articles (and demonstrative pronouns) in Italian, French, etc., whereas the Bulgarian articles are related to demonstrative pronouns in other Slavic languages.

Numeral formation
The Slavic way of composing the numbers between 10 and 20, e.g. "one + on + ten" for eleven, called superessive, is widespread. Greek does not follow this.

Albanian has preserved the vigesimal system, which is considered to be an remnant from a Pre-Indo-European language. The number 20 is described njëzet and 40 as dyzet. In some dialects  '60' and  '80' still may be used. All other Balkan languages lack at this.

Clitic pronouns
Direct and indirect objects are cross-referenced, or doubled, in the verb phrase by a clitic (weak) pronoun, agreeing with the object in gender, number, and case or case function. This can be found in Romanian, Greek, Bulgarian, Macedonian, and Albanian.  In Albanian and Macedonian, this feature shows fully grammaticalized structures and is obligatory with indirect objects and to some extent with definite direct objects; in Bulgarian, however, it is optional and therefore based on discourse.  In Greek, the construction contrasts with the clitic-less construction and marks the cross-referenced object as a topic. Southwest Macedonia appears to be the location of innovation.

For example, "I see George" in Balkan languages:

Note: The neutral case in normal (SVO) word order is without a clitic: "Гледам Георги." However, the form with an additional clitic pronoun is also perfectly normal and can be used for emphasis: "Гледам го Георги." And the clitic is obligatory in the case of a topicalized object (with OVS-word order), which serves also as the common colloquial equivalent of a passive construction. "Георги го гледам."

Adjectives
The replacement of synthetic adjectival comparative forms with analytic ones by means of preposed markers is common.  These markers are:
Bulgarian: по- Macedonian: по (prepended)
Albanian:  mëRomanian:  maiModern Greek:  πιο (pió)
Aromanian: (ca)maMacedonian and Modern Greek have retained some of the earlier synthetic forms. In Bulgarian and Macedonian these have become proper adjectives in their own right without the possibility of [further] comparison. This is more evident in Macedonian: виш = "higher, superior", ниж = "lower, inferior". Compare with similar structures in Bulgarian: висш(-(ия(т))/а(та)/о(то)/и(те)) = "(the) higher, (the) superior" (по-висш(-(ия(т))/а(та)/о(то)/и(те)) = "(the) [more] higher, (the) [more] superior"; 'най-висш(-(ия(т))/о(то)/а(та)/и(те))' = "(the) ([most]) highest, supreme"; нисш (also spelled as низш sometimes) = "low, lower, inferior", it can also possess further comparative or superlative as with 'висш' above.

Another common trait of these languages is the lack of suppletive comparative degrees for the adjective "good" and "bad", unlike other Indo-European languages.

Suffixes
Also, some common suffixes can be found in the language area, such as the diminutive suffix of the Slavic languages (Srb. Bul. Mac.) "-ovo" "-ica" that can be found in Albanian, Greek and Romanian.

Vocabulary

Loanwords
Several hundred words are common to the Balkan union languages; the origin of most of them is either Greek, Bulgarian or Turkish, as the Byzantine Empire, the First Bulgarian Empire, the Second Bulgarian Empire and later the Ottoman Empire directly controlled the territory throughout most of its history, strongly influencing its culture and economics.

Albanian, Aromanian, Bulgarian, Greek, Romanian, Serbo-Croatian and Macedonian also share a large number of words of various origins:

Calques
Apart from the direct loans, there are also many calques that were passed from one Balkan language to another, most of them between Albanian, Macedonian, Bulgarian, Greek, Aromanian and Romanian.

For example, the word "ripen" (as in fruit) is constructed in Albanian, Romanian and (rarely) in Greek (piqem, a (se) coace, ψήνομαι), in Turkish pişmek by a derivation from the word "to bake" (pjek, a coace, ψήνω).

Another example is the wish "(∅/to/for) many years":Note: In Old Church Slavonic and archaic Eastern South Slavic dialects, the term сполай(j) ти (spolaj ti) was commonly used in meaning thank you, derived from the Byzantine Greek εἰς πολλὰ ἔτη (is polla eti).Сполај ти! православие.мк, https://pravoslavie.mk/spolaj-ti/  "Еден израз во нашиот јазик којшто денес го слушаме сѐ поретко, за разлика од порано, а во иднина веројатно целосно ќе се исфрли од употреба и ќе можеме да го слушнеме само во Македонските народни приказни, е токму: „сполај ти“! Иако многу ретко се користи, сите отприлика знаеме што значи – „благодарам“, „фала“ ".

Idiomatic expressions for "whether one <verb> or not" are formed as "<verb>-not-<verb>". "Whether one wants or not":

This is also present in other Slavic languages, eg. Polish chcąc nie chcąc.

Phonetics
The main phonological features consist of:
the presence of an unrounded central vowel, either a mid-central schwa  or a high central vowel phonemeë in Albanian; ъ in Bulgarian; ă in Romanian;  ã in Aromanian
In Romanian and Albanian, the schwa is developed from an unstressed 
Example:  Latin camisia "shirt" > Romanian cămașă , Albanian këmishë )
The schwa phoneme occurs across some dialects of the Macedonian language, but is absent in the standard.
some kind of umlaut in stressed syllables with differing patterns depending on the language.
Romanian:
a mid-back vowel ends in a low glide before a nonhigh vowel in the following syllable.
a central vowel is fronted before a front vowel in the following syllable.
Albanian:  back vowels are fronted before i in the following syllable.

This feature also occurs in Greek, but it is lacking in some of the other Balkan languages; the central vowel is found in Romanian, Bulgarian, some dialects of Albanian, and Serbo-Croatian, but not in Greek or Standard Macedonian.

Less widespread features are confined largely to either Romanian or Albanian, or both:
frequent loss of l before i in Romanian and some Romani dialects
the alternation between n and r in Albanian and Romanian.
change from l to r in Romanian, Greek and very rarely in Bulgarian and Albanian.
the raising of o to u in unstressed syllables in Bulgarian, Romanian and Northern Greek dialects.
change from ea to e before i in Bulgarian and Romanian.

See also
 
 Albanian grammar
 Albanian–Romanian linguistic relationship
 Balkan languages
 Bulgarian grammar
 Greek grammar
 Macedonian grammar
 Paleo-Balkan languages
 Serbo-Croatian grammar
 Turkish grammar

Notes

References
  
 André Du Nay, The Origins of the Rumanians: The Early History of the Rumanian Language, 2nd edn. Toronto–Buffalo, NY: Matthias Corvinus, 1996 (1st edn., 1977), pp. 85–87, 88-97, 190.
 Victor A. Friedman, "After 170 years of Balkan Linguistics: Whither the Millennium?", Mediterranean Language Review 12:1-15, 2000.PDF—an excellent survey article
 Victor A. Friedman, “Balkans as a Linguistic Area”, Concise Encyclopedia of Languages of the World, eds. Keith Brown & Sarah Ogilvie (Elsevier, 2009), 119-134.
  
 Christina E. Kramer, “The Grammaticalization of the Future Tense Auxiliary in the Balkan Languages”, Indiana Slavic Studies 7 (1994): 127–35.
 Alexandru Rosetti, B. Cazacu, & I. Coteanu, eds. Istoria limbii române [History of the Romanian language], 2 vols. Bucharest: Edit. Acad. RSR, 1965 (vol.1), 1969 (vol. 2); 2nd edn., 1978.
 Ion Russu, Limba Traco-Dacilor [The Language of the Thraco-Dacians]. Bucharest: Editura Științifică, 1967.
 Klaus Steinke & Ariton Vraciu, Introducere în lingvistica balcanică [An Introduction to Balkan Linguistics]. Iași: Editura Universității “Alexandru Ioan Cuza”, 1999.
  
 Sarah G. Thomason, Language Contact: An Introduction. Washington, D.C.: Georgetown University Press, 2001, pp. 105–10.
  
 
 Andrej N. Sobolev, ed. Malyi dialektologiceskii atlas balkanskikh iazykov. Munich: Biblion Verlag, 2003-
 Andrej N. Sobolev, “Antibalkanismy”, Južnoslovenski Filolog (2011)  PDF

 Further reading 
 General
 Jack Feuillet. “Aire linguistique balkanique”, Language Typology and Language Universals: An International Handbook, vol. 2, eds. Martin Haspelmath, Ekkehard König, Wulf Oesterreicher, & Wolfgang Raible. NY: Walter de Gruyter, 2001, pp. 1510–28.
 Victor A. Friedman. “Balkans as a Linguistic Area”, Encyclopedia of Language and Linguistics, 2nd edn., ed. Keith Brown. Oxford: Elsevier, 2005, pp. 657–72.
 Brian D. Joseph. “Balkan Languages”, International Encyclopedia of Linguistics, 4 vols., ed. William Bright. Oxford: Oxford University Press, 1992, 1: 153–55.
 Brian D. Joseph. “Language Contact in the Balkans”, The Handbook of Language Contact, ed. Raymond Hickey. Malden, MA–Oxford: Wiley-Blackwell, 2010, pp. 618–33.
 Olga Mišeska Tomić. “Balkan Sprachbund features”, The Languages and Linguistics of Europe: A Comprehensive Guide, eds. Bernd Kortmann & Johan van der Auwera. Berlin–Boston: Walter de Gruyter, 2011, pp. 307–24.
 Piwowarczyk, Dariusz R. (2014). “The Greek Voice Aspirates and Balkan Indo-European”. In: Classica Cracoviensia 17 (December):165-70. https://doi.org/10.12797/CC.17.2014.17.09.
 Overviews
 Helmut Wilhelm Schaller. Die Balkansprachen: Eine Einführung in die Balkanphilologie. Heidelberg: Universitätsverlag C. Winter, 1975.
 Harald Haarmann. Balkanlinguistik. Tübingen: Gunter Narr Verlag, 1978.
 Georg Renatus Solta. Einführung in die Balkanlinguistik mit besonderer Berücksichtigung des Substrats und des Balkanlateinischen. Darmstadt: Wissenschaftliche Buchgesellschaft, 1980.
 G. A. Cyxun. Tipologičeskie problemy balkanoslavjanskogo jazykovogo areala. Moscow: Izdatel’stvo “Nauka i texnika”, 1981.
 Emanuele Banfi. Linguistica balcanica. Bologna: Zanichelli, 1985.
 Jack Feuillet. La linguistique balkanique. Paris: INALCO, 1986.
 Agnija Desnickaja. Osnovy balkanskogo jazykoznanija. Leningrad: Nauka, 1990.
 Shaban Demiraj. Gjuhësi balkanike [Balkan Linguistics]. Skopje: Logos-A., 1994.
 Norbert Reiter. Grundzüge der Balkanologie: Ein Schritt in die Eurolinguistik. Wiesbaden: Otto Harrassowitz, 1994.
 Klaus Steinke & Ariton Vraciu. Introducere în lingvistica balcanică [An Introduction to Balkan Linguistics]. Iași: Editura Universității “Alexandru Ioan Cuza”, 1999.
 Uwe Hinrichs, ed. Handbuch der Südosteuropa-Linguistik. Wiesbaden: Otto Harrassowitz, 1999.
 Petja Asenova. Balkansko ezikoznanie: Osnovni problemi na balkanskija ezikov sŭjuz. Veliko Tărnovo: Faber, 2002.
 Victor Friedman. “Balkan Slavic dialectology and Balkan linguistics: Periphery as center”, American contributions to the 14th International Congress of Slavists, Ohrid, September 2008, ed. Christina Yurkiw Bethin & David M. Bethea. Bloomington, IN: Slavica, 2008, pp. 131–48.
 Victor Friedman. “The Balkan languages and Balkan linguistics”, Annual Review of Anthropology 40 (2011): 275–91.
 History
 Petja Asenova. “Aperçu historique des études dans le domaine de la linguistique balkanique”, Balkansko ezikoznanie 22, no. 1 (1979): 5–45. 
 Brian D. Joseph. “On the Need for History in Balkan Linguistics”, Kenneth E. Naylor Memorial Lecture Series, vol. 10. Ann Arbor, MI: Beech Stave, 2008.
 Balkanisms
 Howard I. Aronson. “Towards a Typology of the Balkan Future”, Indiana Slavic Studies 7 (1994): 9–18.
 Howard I. Aronson. The Balkan Linguistic League, “Orientalism”, and Linguistic Typology. Ann Arbor, MI–NY: Beech Stave, 2006.
 Bridget Drinka. “The Balkan Perfects: Grammaticalizion and Contact”, Language Contact in Europe: The Periphrastic Perfect through History. Cambridge: Cambridge University Press, 2017, pp. 267–87.
 Victor A. Friedman. “The Typology of Balkan Evidentiality and Areal Linguistics”, Balkan Syntax and Semantics, ed. Olga Mišeska Tomić. Amsterdam–Philadelphia: John Benjamins, 2004, pp. 101–135.
 Brian D. Joseph. The Synchrony and Diachrony of the Balkan Infinitive: A Study in Areal, General, and Historical Linguistics. Cambridge: Cambridge University Press, 1983 (reprint 2009).
 Dalina Kallulli & Liliane Tasmowski, eds. Clitic Doubling in the Balkan Languages. Amsterdam: John Benjamins, 2008.
 Christina E. Kramer. “The Grammaticalization of the Future Tense Auxiliary in the Balkan Languages”, Indiana Slavic Studies 7 (1994): 127–35.
 Christina E. Kramer. “Negation and the Grammaticalization of Have and Want Futures in Bulgarian and Macedonian”, Canadian Slavonic Papers/Revue Canadienne des Slavistes 39, no. 3–4 (1997): 407–16.
 Maria-Luisa Rivero & Angela Ralli, eds. Comparative Syntax of the Balkan Languages. Oxford: Oxford University Press, 2001.
 Zuzanna Topolińska. “The Balkan Sprachbund from a Slavic perspective”, Zbornik Matice srpske za filologiju i lingvistiku'' 53, no. 1 (2010): 33–60.

Sprachbund